Pogonatum is a genus of mosses — commonly called spike moss — which contains approximately 70 species that cover a cosmopolitan distribution. It can be seen mostly in Asian countries with a tropical climate.

Species
There are about 156 species known in all, 9 in North America.

References

Polytrichaceae
Moss genera